Iressa microsema is a moth in the family Cosmopterigidae. It is found on the Marquesas Islands.

References

Natural History Museum Lepidoptera generic names catalog

Cosmopteriginae